The North Fork Clinch River is a river in the U.S. states of Virginia and Tennessee.  It rises along the slopes of Wallen Ridge in Lee County, Virginia, and empties into the Clinch River at Hancock County, Tennessee, just across the Tennessee/Virginia state line.

See also
List of rivers of Virginia

References

USGS Hydrologic Unit Map - State of Virginia (1974)

Rivers of Virginia
Rivers of Tennessee
Rivers of Lee County, Virginia
Bodies of water of Hancock County, Tennessee